USA Taekwondo (USAT) is the national governing body (NGB) of Taekwondo for the United States Olympic Committee (USOC) and thus the United States's official Member National Association of World Taekwondo USAT has complete authority over all decisions regarding US national junior and senior team selections for World Taekwondo events, including the Summer Olympic Games Taekwondo competition event.

History
The group formed in the 1970s as the AAU National Taekwondo Association, but later broke away from the AAU and created the United States Taekwondo Union (USTU). In 2005, its name changed again to USA Taekwondo after the USOC took over the governance of the USTU in 2004. In 2006, the first USAT Board of Directors was elected by the membership.

The headquarters of USAT is located in Colorado Springs, Colorado.

Leadership
 Dr. Ken Min (Chairman-National AAU Taekwondo Committee 1974-1978)
 Dr. Dong Ja Yang (Chairman-AAU National Taekwondo Union 1979-1984)
 Grand Master Moo Young Lee (US Taekwondo Union 1985-1986)
 Grand Master Kyongwon Ahn (US Taekwondo Union 1986-1988, 1989–1992)
 Grand Master Hwa Chong (US Taekwondo Union 1993-1996)
 Grand Master Sang Lee (US Taekwondo Union 1997-2000)
 Harvey Berkey (Chair USA Taekwondo 2006)
 Ronda Sweet (Chair USA Taekwondo 2007-2009)
 Kevin Padilla (Chair USA Taekwondo 2010–?)
 David Askinas (CEO USA Taekwondo 2006-2011).
 Eric Parthen (CEO USA Taekwondo 2011-2012)
 Bruce Harris (CEO USA Taekwondo 2013–2016)
 Keith Ferguson (CEO USA Taekwondo 2016-2017)
 Steve MacNally (CEO USA Taekwondo 2017–present)

USA Taekwondo in the Olympic Games
During its history many athletes representing the USAT at the Olympics have been successful at obtaining medals.

1988 – Seoul, South Korea (demonstration sport)
U.S. MEDALISTS				
Dana Hee - Gold			
Arlene Limas - Gold		
Lynnette Love - Gold						
Jimmy Kim - Gold
Debra Holloway - Silver
Juan Moreno - Silver
Mayumi Pejo - Bronze
Sharon Jewell - Bronze
Han Won Lee - Bronze
Greg Baker - Bronze
Jay Warwick - Bronze

1992 – Barcelona, Spain (demonstration sport)
U.S. MEDALISTS
Herbert Perez - Gold
Juan Moreno - Silver
Diane Murray - Silver
Danielle Laney - Bronze
Lynnette Love - Bronze
Terry Poindexter - Bronze

2000 – Sydney, Australia
U.S. MEDALISTS	
 Barbara Kunkel - Silver			
 Steven López - Gold

2004 – Athens, Greece
U.S. MEDALISTS
 Steven López - Gold
 Nia Abdallah - Silver

2008 - Beijing, China
U.S. MEDALISTS
 Mark López - Silver
 Diana López - Bronze
 Steven López - Bronze

2012 - London, England
U.S. MEDALISTS
 Paige McPherson - Bronze
 Terrence Jennings - Bronze

2016 - Rio de Janeiro, Brazil 
U.S. MEDALISTS
 Jackie Galloway - Bronze

References

United States
Taekwondo
Taekwondo in the United States
1978 establishments in the United States
Sports organizations established in 1978
National members of World Taekwondo
Organizations based in Colorado Springs, Colorado
National Taekwondo teams